The 1918 Washington & Jefferson Red and Black football team represented Washington & Jefferson College as an independent during the 1918 college football season. Led by Ralph Hutchinson in his first and only year as head coach, Washington & Jefferson compiled a record of 2–2.

Schedule

References

Washington and Jefferson
Washington & Jefferson Presidents football seasons
Washington and Jefferson Red and Black football